The Suicide 1990 Soviet black comedy film directed by Valery Pendrakovsky,  adaptation of the play of the same name by Nikolai Erdman.

Cast 
 Sergey Shakurov as Podsekalnikov 
 Leonid Kuravlyov as Kalabushkin 
 Aleksandr Trofimov as Aristarkh Dominikovich
 Vyacheslav Nevinny as Pugachyov 
 Vladimir Menshov as Viktor Viktorovich 
 Yelena Stepanenko as  Cleopatra Maksimovna
 Olga Volkova as Raisa Filippovna
 Yelizaveta Nikishchina as Serafima Ilyinichna
 Igor Kashintsev as father  Elpidy
 Gotlib Roninson as  carver
 Valentin Gaft as entertainer

Critical response
Film critic Alexander Fedorov noted:
Valery Pendrakovsky is not one of the elite of Russian directing, but having the classical dramaturgy of Nikolai Erdman as a literary basis and having collected a bouquet of famous actors, he quite convincingly created on the screen a phantasmagoric world of a  universal  communal apartment in which  every creature lives in a couple.

References

External links 
 

1990 films
1990s Russian-language films
Mosfilm films
Soviet black comedy films
1990 comedy films
Russian films based on plays
Films about the Soviet Union in the Stalin era
Films set in Russia
Films shot in Russia
1990s black comedy films